Southport Football Club is an association football club based in Southport, Merseyside. They play their home matches at Haig Avenue, which has a capacity of 5,414. They are known by their nickname "the Sandgrounders". The club's main honour is winning the 1972–73 Football League Fourth Division championship and they have won a number of titles in non-League football.

Founded in 1888 as Southport Central, the club were members of regional leagues such as the Lancashire League, the Lancashire Combination and The Central League for many years until 1921 when they were invited to become a founding member of the newly formed Football League Third Division North. Southport held membership of The Football League from 1921 to 1978. They failed to gain re-election in 1978 and since then have been members of the Northern Premier League (1978 to 1993), the Football Conference (1993 to 2003) and then the Northern Premier League Premier Division (2003–04). Southport were transferred to the new National League North in 2004 and, since then, have played in either that division (tier 6) or the tier 5 National League. In 2017, Southport were relegated from tier 5 to tier 6 and currently (2022–23) they are again playing in the National League North.

Prior to their formation, a number of amateur sides played football in the town, the earliest of which was formed in 1881 from the remnants of a failed Rugby team, and participated in the FA Cup in the 1882–83 tournament. Southport's best performance in the  FA Cup came in the 1930–31 tournament when they reached the quarter-finals (last eight) but were then beaten 9–1 by Everton at Goodison Park. Southport had another good FA Cup run in 1965–66 when they reached the fifth round (last sixteen) and were beaten 2–0 by Hull City at Boothferry Park. Southport took part in the Football League Cup from 1960 to 1978 but never progressed beyond the first two rounds. The team reached the final of the FA Trophy in 1997–98, played at the old Wembley Stadium, but lost 1–0 to Cheltenham Town.

History

The Original Amateur Club: 1881–1886

Although association football was played in the town’s private schools in the late 1870’s the first association club was not formed in the town until November 1881. Bearing the name of Southport Football club, the club had originally begun as a rugby club, the ‘handling code’ having been played competitively since 1872.

The man responsible for the decision to switch was a former Welsh international, Thomas Blundell Burnett. In the story of Southport Football Club, Burnett’s role is very significant. He was the instigator of the switch, he was the Secretary of the new club, and he was also the Captain. He was the pioneer of association football in Southport, of that there is absolutely no doubt.

The club played its games on a field on a large plot of land opposite to the entrance of Chambers Road on the corner Scarisbrick New Road and Ash Street backing onto Trap Lane (today’s Southbank Road), roughly where Westmoreland Road lies today. There was space enough for multiple pitches, one of which was used by Southport Olympic rugby club.

Encouraged by their first year, Southport joined both the Lancashire and English Football Associations and entered the English, Lancashire and Liverpool and District Challenge Cups. The competitive element of the cup-ties aroused most interest. On 7th October, Southport entertained Liverpool Ramblers in their first ever F.A., or English Challenge Cup tie as the competition was called for years. This game was watched by 300 spectators including many women supporters and resulted in a 1-1 draw, Ambler scoring for Southport following a neat pass from Arthur Dalby.

In the 1884-85 season the club merged with the Southport Athletic Society. The team moved to the Sports Ground, on Sussex Road. It was unanimously decided to change their red jerseys for red and white striped flannel shirts. The Reds were thereby now known as “The Stripes”.

As football grew in popularity other clubs sprang up in the town. Southport Wanderers, High Park, Churchtown and Southport Old Boys were amongst the most prominent. However Southport Football Club was considered to be the town’s premier side.

Off the field the club was not in a healthy state and in the 1885/86 season they were facing stiff competition from twenty six other clubs in the town. Southport reduced their annual subscriptions to five shillings to try and compete but were later forced to sever their connections with the Athletic Society and in the Athletic Society’s Annual report the Committee regretted ‘their unfortunate connection with the Football Club which resulted in the Society incurring an expenditure on their account of £88-3 shillings.

After five years existence Southport’s first football club folded.

Southport Wanderers: 1884–1888

Southport Wanderers formed as an amateur outfit in 1884 by members of the Southport Olympic rugby club.   By the summer of 1886 Wanderers had grown into one of the most popular clubs in the town. In fact, by the time of the demise of the original Southport Football Club they were able to field a first and second eleven on a regular basis, something the original club struggled to do for much of the 1885/1886 season.

At the Wanderers AGM in June 1886, at which a representative of the original Southport association club was present, they invited Southport Football Club to amalgamate

At least six former Southport players and many of their supporters transferred their affiliations to Southport Wanderers. Southport Wanderers moved to a new ground in Scarisbrick New Road for the 1886-87 season. It was a large field, enclosed to a height of 7 foot 6 inches and big enough to accommodate three matches at once. A covered grandstand, to seat 140 spectators, and a dressing tent were provided. Three cows which grazed on the field withdrew behind the grandstand during matches.

At a General Meeting held in the Mather’s Saleroom on Chapel Street, it was unanimously resolved that in future the club be called ‘Southport Football Club’ Thus imparting to it a representative character which it had not hitherto enjoyed.

A new professional club - Southport Central: 1888-1921

On 2nd June 1888 the Southport Guardian newspaper revealed that there was a scheme in the town to provide a football club of ‘Mighty proportions’..by raising an importation team’ Professional football was about to be launched in Southport.

In the summer of 1888, the year the Football League was founded, with the game increasing in popularity, It was felt that a team of stronger calibre should be formed to represent the district The idea met with favour and the initial meeting called to form such a club took place on 12th June at Victoria Galleries, Chapel Street.

At a second meeting, held at the Railway Hotel a week later, Mr. Robert McGown (erroneously reported in the Guardian as “McGowan”), once secretary of the High Park club, successfully proposed that the name of the club should be “Southport Central Association Football Club”.

When the proposition to form a committee was put eleven voted in favour, none against and nineteen abstained. Mr James of Hoghton Street was appointed Honorary Treasurer, Edwin Ramsbottom Secretary and an Executive Committee was formed.

At a meeting held on 29th August, Mr. J. B. Watson explaining the objects of the club said it was likely to place Southport in the front rank of football with the certain result of bringing increased crowds of visitors to the town and it was confirmed that “Foreign talent” would be introduced by paying players.

The club’s record for their initial season was Played 40 Won 21 Drawn 6 Lost 13.

The event which caused the most excitement in the town was the visit of Preston North end who had just carried off the League and Cup double. They came to Southport on 13th May and were given a rapturous welcome on arrival at the railway station. They were driven to the ground behind a marching band. There was a record gate of 3,500 and North End won 4-2 even though Central were re-inforced for the occasion by Forbes, Townley and Southworth of Blackburn Rovers.

The club joined the newly formed Lancashire League. Following the success of the Football League it was hardly surprising that there would be a demand for a County Competition in Lancashire At a meeting organized by the Secretary of the Earlestown club the Lancashire League became a reality. Isaac Smith, Central’s Chairman, became the league’s first treasurer.

At the start of the 1905–06 season Central moved to its present home, Haig Avenue, which was then known as Ash Lane. In 1911, the club became founder members of the Central League. In 1918, the club was renamed as Southport Vulcan – having been bought by the Vulcan Motor Company – becoming the first club to take a sponsor's name.

Football League: 1921–1978

In 1921 the club, now named simply Southport, joined the Football League and became a founder member of the Third Division North. In 1931, Southport became the first club from the Third Division North to reach the sixth round (quarter-finals) of the FA Cup, where they lost 9–1 to Everton. A year later the club recorded its record attendance, when 20,010 watched them play Newcastle United in the fourth round of the FA Cup.

Having finished in the bottom half of the table at the end of the 1957–58 season, the club dropped into the Fourth Division following the reorganisation of the Third Division North and Third Division South into Third and Fourth Divisions. The club's first promotion came at the end of the 1966–67 season, when they finished as runners-up in the Fourth Division behind Stockport County under the guidance of Billy Bingham, who later went on to manage the Northern Irish national team. They were relegated back to the Fourth Division in 1970, but won promotion again in 1973 when they finished as Fourth Division Champions. Relegation back to the Fourth Division followed the very next season. This heralded a period of decline as crowds dropped – on some occasions into just three figures – and the ground fell into disrepair.

Disaster struck in 1978, when the club was voted out of the Football League following three consecutive 23rd (out of 24) placed finishes, and was replaced by Wigan Athletic. The voting couldn't have been tighter, as the clubs drew on the first ballot (when many had expected Rochdale to be voted out), but Wigan's superior canvassing ensured that they won the second ballot. Southport was the last club to leave the Football League through the re-election process. Automatic relegation from the Fourth Division was introduced in 1986–87.

Non-League football: from 1978

After several seasons with South Liverpool, Brian Kettle was appointed manager and was instrumental in one of the most successful periods. Kettle had a difficult task from the off, his first season in charge saw him start with only three players Andy Johnston, Stuart Bimson and club captain Rob Sturgeon. After a poor start to the season which saw the club in the relegation places until mid-October after bringing in several new players such as Ossie Smith, Bob Howard, Steve Whitehall, Steve Holden, Peter Wright, Alan McDonald, the returning Ian Baines and for the third time Tony Quinn they finished the season in a very respectable seventh place in the Northern Premier League, albeit 38 points off the champions Colne Dynamoes who were not accepted for promotion and ultimately folded.

For the 1990–91 season, very little changed and was a very exciting season for the club. The free-scoring prowess of Holden and Whitehall saw the club reach 100 league goals in March and four semi-final appearances, losing only one. Ultimately due to the cup runs, the league performance suffered and they only managed to finish 5th in the league. However, there was now renewed optimism in the town.

The 1991–92 season started dreadfully for the club due to the loss of key personnel in the summer. Holden and Whitehall both left within weeks, the latter going for a club record £25,000 to Rochdale. Kettle had to rebuild once again, but it didn't go to plan straightaway. The club were bottom of the table till September, only managing to win their first game at the start of October. After a series of good runs, they managed to claw their way up the table to once again finish seventh.

The 1992–93 season was one of the most important seasons in the clubs recent history. Southport impressively won the league with 96 points and once again scoring 100 goals and tasted success in two more cup competitions and an excellent FA Cup run took them through to the second round proper for the first time since 1968.

In 1998 the club had its first (and only) trip to Wembley, when they lost 1–0 to Cheltenham Town in the final of the FA Trophy. 10,000 Southport fans made the trip to London to see the match.

The club were relegated back to the Northern Premier League at the end of the 2002–03 season. They became founder members of the new Conference North in 2004–05, and were the league's first Champions, earning promotion back to the newly renamed Conference National. In the 2005–06 season, Southport spent much of their time at the bottom of the table, but managed to secure survival with a five-game unbeaten run culminating in a 1–1 away draw with third-placed Grays Athletic on 25 April. The manager at the time, Liam Watson, stated that this feat was more impressive than their title winning accomplishments the season before.

Full-time: 2006–2008

In 2006 the club changed to full-time, with Liam Watson moving to Burscough at the end of the season a new manager in Paul Cook was appointed. This led to a massive overhaul of the squad, with many players unwilling or unable to go full-time. This proved to be a disastrous turn of events. Cook had to assemble a complete squad with just six of the original squad remaining. After a run of poor results, his contract was terminated on 3 January 2007.

The first match after Cook's departure saw Dino Maamria and Steve Whitehall take over as caretaker manager team and they succeeded in leading the team to a 3–1 home win over free-falling Grays, a match which also saw Carl Baker make his 100th appearance in a Southport shirt.

The only other match which saw the Maamria-Whitehall manager team was a 2–1 defeat in the FA Trophy at the hands of Salisbury before Peter Davenport, who had previously had an unbeaten spell as caretaker-manager of the club in 2001, was named as Cook's successor two weeks later.

Davenport's new team, aided with decent signings in the transfer window, started to churn out decent results. This did not last long however, and, due to Southport's ability to concede late goals in most games, the club looked certain to drop down a league, however again doubts were cast as the club won 4 matches on the run, and with two matches left were only two points off safety. However these matches were against play off hopefuls York City and Exeter City. After losing to a Clayton Donaldson penalty against York, the Sandgrounders were relegated the following Tuesday, not even playing a game, after relegation rivals Grays and Halifax both won their games.

The club stayed full-time, looking to bounce straight back up from the Conference North to the top of non-League football.

Southport signed Neil Prince and Karl Noon from Stalybridge Celtic and Marine respectively. Peter Davenport also brought in goalkeeper Richard Whiteside, midfielder Dave Prout and right back Chris Lever after trials from Oldham. The biggest news in the transfer period for Southport fans however, was the departure of star right winger Carl Baker to Morecambe, for a fee believed to be £50,000.

Southport Football Club announced on Monday 7 April 2008 that manager Peter Davenport and assistant Huw Griffiths left the club with immediate effect. The club placed on record their appreciation for everything they both contributed to Southport Football Club.

Former player Gary Brabin was initially given the job until the end of the season and guided the team into the play-offs only to go out on penalties away at Stalybridge Celtic, however only three days later the club announced their ambitions early by appointing him full-time and thus keeping their full-time playing status for another season at least. However, this appointment turned out to be only an agreement to sign a future contract, and after an approach from Cambridge United, Brabin left Southport to sign as Cambridge manager on 23 June 2008.

Return to part-time: from 2008

On 30 June 2008 the club's official website confirmed that Liam Watson had rejoined Southport as first team manager following his resignation from Burscough.

This change saw the arrival of numerous part-time players, following Watson from Burscough including Conference North top scorer Ciaran Kilheeney, Watson's co-Players of the Year – Adam Flynn and Anthony McMillan, as well former Southport players, Matty McGinn, Earl Davis, Robbie Booth and Steve Daly. Retained players, Michael Powell and Neil Robinson, chose to return to part-time football, whilst Matt Hocking, Neil Prince and club captain, Chris Holland left the club. Kevin Lee and Tony Gray signed new part-time contracts at the start of the season, and thus Southport practically returned fully to a part-time club. During that season Tony Gray and John Doolan departed the club, as well as Craig Noone, who moved to Championship side Plymouth Argyle.

The 2008–09 season saw Southport reach the Conference North play-offs, having finished in fifth place. However, a home defeat, followed by an away draw against Gateshead left Southport to battle for a further season in the Conference North. Only four defeats during 2009–10 saw Southport finally secure the League title following a 3–0 away victory at Eastwood Town on the final Saturday of the season, spurred on by over 700 travelling Sandgrounders. They finished just one point ahead of near neighbours Fleetwood Town. The success of the first team, who also lifted the Lancashire FA Challenge Trophy following victory against Clitheroe at the Reebok Stadium, was mirrored by the club's youth team who won both the Lancashire League and Conference North Youth League.

Non-League top flight (2010 to 2017)

In 2010–11, the first season back in the Conference, Southport finished in the relegation zone of the Conference National, but were reprieved after Rushden & Diamonds were expelled from the league.

The 2011–12 season saw a change of fortune for the club, with the implementation of a new, extended training schedule seeing an upturn in performances and results. On 26 November 2011, a club record of consecutive away victories was broken with the Sandgrounder's 1–0 win at Stockport County, their 8th in succession. Although narrowly missing out on a play off spot, having occupied one of the top five positions for long periods of the season, the 2011–12 season saw the 'Port finish in a very impressive 7th place, the club's highest league finish in 10 years.

During the 2012–13 season Southport failed to repeat its successful performance in the prior season and finished 5th from bottom, just one place above the relegation zone. On 17 April 2013 it was announced that Watson would be leaving Southport once again, but on more amiable terms resigning, ostensibly, in order to 'take a break from the game'. Soon after, he was appointed manager of AFC Telford who he led to promotion in his first season.

On 15 May 2013, Alan Wright was appointed Southport manager, along with John Hills as his assistant manager. Southport kicked off the 2013–14 season with a 1–0 home win over Luton Town, just the beginning of a good start to the season, Wright managed the team to four straight home wins. However the good form didn't last long, a run of 8 straight defeats away from home saw Wright's side drop to the lower half of the table. A 2–2 draw to Macclesfield ended the losing away run, followed by a 6–2 victory over Marske United in the FA Cup 4th Qualifying Round and a 1–0 win against previously unbeaten table toppers Cambridge United. This looked like a catalyst for a turnaround in fortunes, however Southport lost their next six games, eliminated from both the FA Cup and FA Trophy, and sat in 18th place in the table, Alan Wright left the club on Friday 7 December 2013.

His replacement was named just a day later on Saturday 8 December 2013, as John Coleman, former Accrington Stanley manager, who had previously played for Southport over 25 years earlier. Under Coleman the club escaped relegation, finishing the season in fine form. This spell also led to a change in the club's training schedule, with sessions during the day, rather than evening, unlike a majority of part-time clubs.

To the consternation of the fans, Coleman was not retained as manager; instead the Board appointed Martin Foyle formerly the manager of Hereford United. A number of first team players left the club at the end of the season (including several who had been on loan) leaving Foyle with a major rebuilding task for the 2014–15 season.  Foyle was dismissed in October 2014 and replaced by Gary Brabin who returned to the club for his second spell as manager. Despite a run in the FA Cup culminating in a spirited third round defeat to Championship side Derby County, Brabin's spell was short lived, accepting an academy role with Everton. Paul Carden, previously assistant to Brabin, became manager and was joined by Alex Russell as assistant manager, son of the club legend of the same name. The club secured Conference survival yet again in 2015, finishing 19th in the league.

Carden's team started the 2015–16 season in poor form, leading to his departure from the club in November 2015, Dino Maamria became Southport's seventh manager since April 2013 shortly after. On 19 March 2016 Andy Bishop was appointed caretaker player/manager of the club after Dino Maamria left the club for family reasons.

On 6 September 2016, Liam Watson was announced as returning to Southport for the third time but in a new capacity. Watson joined the board of directors along with local businessmen Nigel Allen and David Barron. He will take up the newly created role as Operations Director. Steve Burr was announced as the manager of Southport on 8 September 2016 following the departure of Andy Bishop 5 days earlier.

On 30 January 2017 Steve Burr was sacked after a poor run of form and being one point above the drop zone. Andy Preece was appointed Manager on 8 February, their eleventh since April 2013 but another poor run of form saw them slip to the foot of the table in March. On Friday 14 April 2017, Southport relegation to the National League North was confirmed after a 3–0 loss to Dover Athletic. Following confirmation of relegation, long term chairman Charlie Clapham announced he would be stepping from the board of directors on 21 April 2017, along with vice-chairman Sam Shrouder. Southport then parted ways with Manager Andy Preece on 5 May 2017.

National League North and new board

On 15 May 2017 it was announced that local accountant and supporter James Treadwell would become the club's new chairman, his first appointment was to welcome back former manager Mark Wright as Head of Development. Southport appointed Alan Lewer as manager on 30 May 2017. The 2017–18 season started well for the new management team, winning the five of their first eight league games. Following supporter's campaigning since May, law firm director Phil Hodgkinson joined the board of directors on 5 September 2017. Having lost their next six games after this date, Wright and Lewer were dismissed on 26 September 2017.

Kevin Davies was appointed manager on 18 October 2017 on a two-and-a-half-year contract. Southport secured survival on 21 April 2018 despite losing 1–0 to Brackley Town. Despite this, Davies was dismissed as manager on 30 April 2018. After a spell scouting for Scunthorpe United, Liam Watson was reappointed manager of Southport on 7 May 2018.

It was confirmed during the summer of 2019 that Phil Hodgkinson would step down as Southport's owner and director so that he could replace Dean Hoyle as majority shareholder and chairman of Championship club Huddersfield Town. On his departure from Southport, Hodgkinson sold his shares to Ian Kyle, Steve Porter and manager, Liam Watson, to create a new-look boardroom.

Summary of recent seasons

Honours

Trust in Yellow
Trust in Yellow is the Supporters' Trust of the club. It was formed on 26 April 2006 by a set of supporters who were unhappy with the lack of communication between the club and its fans in an effort to get more involved and have a bigger say in the running of the club. T.I.Y. is a member of Supporters' Direct, a body funded by Sport England.

Players

Current squad

Club officials

Current managerial team

Managerial history

Board of directors and officials

Further reading

The Town's Game: The Origins of Rugby and Association Football in Southport, by Daniel J. Hayes (2022). 

The Sandgrounders: The Complete League History of Southport F. C., by Michael Braham and Geoff Wilde (Palatine Books, 1995). 

The Complete Non-League History of Southport Football Club 1978–2008, by Trust in Yellow (Legends Publishing, 2008).

References

External links

History of Southport FC
Southport F.C. Statistics website
Trust In Yellow, Independent Supporters Trust
Port Chat, Fans' Message Board & Forum

 
Football clubs in England
Football clubs in Merseyside
Association football clubs established in 1881
1881 establishments in England
Lancashire League (football)
Lancashire Combination
The Central League
Former English Football League clubs
Northern Premier League clubs
National League (English football) clubs
Sport in Southport